This is a list of the princes of Transylvania.

List of princes

Sixteenth century

Seventeenth century

Eighteenth century

See also 
 List of rulers of Transylvania
 List of consorts of Transylvania

Footnotes

References

  Bán, Péter (1989). Entry székely ispán in: Bán, Péter; Magyar történelmi fogalomtár, II. kötet: L–Zs ("Thesaurus of Terms of Hungarian History, Volume I: A–Zs"). Gondolat. .
 Barta, Gábor (1994). The Emergence of the Principality and its First Crises (1526–1606). In: Köpeczi, Béla; Barta, Gábor; Bóna, István; Makkai, László; Szász, Zoltán; Borus, Judit; History of Transylvania; Akadémiai Kiadó; .
 Deák, Éva (2009). "Princeps non Principissa": Catherine of Brandenburg, Elected Prince of Transylvania  (1630–1648). In: Cruz, Anne J.; Suzuki, Mihoko; The Rule of Women in Early Modern Europe; University of Illinois Press; .
  Fallenbüchl, Zoltán (1988). Magyarország főméltóságai ("Great Officers of State in Hungary"). Maecenas Könyvkiadó. .
 Felezeu, Călin (2009). The International Political Background (1541–1699) and The Legal Status of the Principality of Transylvania in Its Relations with the Ottoman Porte. In: Pop, Ioan-Aurel; Nägler, Thomas; Magyari, András;
 Georgescu, Vlad (1991). The Romanians: A History. Ohio State University Press. .
 Makkai, László (1994). The Emergence of the Estates (1172–1526). In: Köpeczi, Béla; Barta, Gábor; Bóna, István; Makkai, László; Szász, Zoltán; Borus, Judit; History of Transylvania; Akadémiai Kiadó; .
  Markó, László (2000). A magyar állam főméltóságai Szent Istvántól napjainkig: Életrajzi Lexikon ("Great Officers of State in Hungary from King Saint Stephen to Our Days: A Biographical Encyclopedia"). Magyar Könyvklub. 
 Pop, Ioan-Aurel (1999). Romanians and Romania: A Brief History. Boulder (distributed by Columbia University Press). .
 Pop, Ioan-Aurel (2005). Romanians in the 14th–16th Centuries: From the "Christian Republic" to the "Restoration of Dacia". In: Pop, Ioan-Aurel; Bolovan, Ioan; History of Romania: Compendium; Romanian Cultural Institute (Center for Transylvanian Studies). .
 Pop, Ioan-Aurel (2009). Michael the Brave and Transylvania. In: Pop, Ioan-Aurel; Nägler, Thomas; Magyari, András; The History of Transylvania, Vol. II. (From 1541 to 1711); Romanian Academy, Center for Transylvanian Studies; .
 Szegedi, Edit (2009). The birth and evolution of the Principality of Transylvania (1541–1690). In: Pop, Ioan-Aurel; Nägler, Thomas; Magyari, András; The History of Transylvania, Vol. II. (From 1541 to 1711); Romanian Academy, Center for Transylvanian Studies; .

External links 

 
Transylvanian princes
Transylvania
Transylvania
Transylvanian princes
Hungarian royalty